Onychognathus is a genus of starlings, most of which are found in Africa.

All the species are quite similar, and characterised by rufous primary wing feathers, very obvious in flight. The males are typically mainly glossy black, and the females have dull (sometimes dark, depending on species) grey heads.

The genus was introduced by the German physician and ornithologist Gustav Hartlaub in 1849 with the chestnut-winged starling as the type species. The name Onychognathus combines the Ancient Greek words onukhos "claw" or "nail" and gnathos "jaw".

The genus contains 11 species.

Red-winged starling, Onychognathus morio
Slender-billed starling, Onychognathus tenuirostris
Chestnut-winged starling, Onychognathus fulgidus
Waller's starling, Onychognathus walleri
Somali starling, Onychognathus blythii
Socotra starling, Onychognathus frater
Tristram's starling, Onychognathus tristramii
Pale-winged starling, Onychognathus nabouroup
Bristle-crowned starling, Onychognathus salvadorii
White-billed starling, Onychognathus albirostris
Neumann's starling, Onychognathus neumanni

References

Further reading

 
Bird genera
Taxonomy articles created by Polbot